This is a list of the tallest buildings in Norway.

Tallest completed buildings

Tallest under construction or proposed

References
 Emporis
 Structurae

Norway
Norway

Tallest